Sheykh Zahed Mahalleh (also Romanized as Sheykh Zāhed Maḩalleh) is a village in Owshiyan Rural District, Chaboksar District, Rudsar County, Gilan Province, Iran. At the 2006 census, its population was 77, in 19 families.

References 

Populated places in Rudsar County